Maxim Leo (born 30 January 1970) is a German journalist and author. He was born in East German and studied Political Science at the Free University of Berlin. He has been an editor at the Berliner Zeitung since 1997. In 2011, he won the European Book Prize for his book Red Love, detailing his family's history during the Cold War in East Germany.

References 

1970 births
Living people
Free University of Berlin alumni
Journalists from Berlin
Writers from Berlin